Willibald Schulze was a German writer who belonged to the Nazi Party.

Work
Willibald Schulze praised Pierre-Joseph Proudhon as the Wegweiser, or signpost, of the Third Reich because Proudhon rejected revolutionary socialism, interest capital and parliamentarianism.  He asserted that Proudhon's ideas were closer to National Socialism.

Writings of Schulze
Ottomar Beta: Der Schlüssel zu Goethe's "Faust": (Old Iniquity). Edited by Willibald Schulze, Leipzig 1924.
"Nicht Eigentum, sondern Besitz!", in  Hammer. Blätter für Deutschen Sinn, Vol. XXX, 699/700, August 1931, p. 202-205.
"Proudhon", in Hammer. Blätter für deutschen Sinn, Vol. XXX, 93/694, Mai 1931, p. 113-120.
"Volkswirtschaft ohne Geld?", in Hammer. Blätter für deutschen Sinn, Vol. XXX, 701/702, September 1931, p. 229-231.
Der Weltsinn der Technik. Leipzig: Armanen-Verl., 1935.
"War Proudhon Anarchist?", Deutschlands Erneuerung, XXIII, (1939), p. 14 - 21.

References
Schapiro; J. Salwyn; Liberalism and the Challenge of Fascism: Social Forces in England and France, 1815-1870,  McGraw-Hill Book Company, Inc., NY, 1949. pg 368. 

20th-century German writers
Year of birth missing
Year of death missing
20th-century German male writers